Dominik Wania (born 24 November 1981 in Sanok, Poland) is a Polish pianist and composer.

Biography 
Wania started his piano studies at age three. In 2005 he graduated from the Academy of Music in Kraków, Poland, where he was an honors music student studying classical piano performance. In 2006 he was awarded The Helena Foundation Presidential Scholarship at New England Conservatory of Music in Boston where he pursued Master of Music degree in Jazz Performance. While at NEC Dominik Wania studied with Danilo Perez, Jerry Bergonzi, George Garzone, Ran Blake, Allan Chase and Frank Carlberg. He also was a member of one of NEC’s prestigious Honors Ensembles.

Wania has performed and collaborated with musicians like Vladislav Sendecki, Tomasz Stańko, Marcus Miller, Dave Liebman, Lee Konitz, Anders Jormin, Gary Thomas, George Garzone, Eddie Henderson, Marilyn Mazur, Joey Baron, Nguyen Le, Don Byron, Jacek Kochan, Zbigniew Namysłowski, and Janusz Muniak among others. Currently he is involved with projects including Maciej Obara International Quartet with Ole Morten Vågan, Gard Nilssen, and Noise Trio. Besides giving performances he is also a DMA faculty member at the Academy of Music in Krakow and Institute of Jazz in Katowice. The release of his debut album Ravel (2013) was with Ravel’s Miroirs arranged for jazz trio.

Honors 

 2003: 1st Prize at the 7th International Contemporary Chamber Music Competition in Kraków
 2005: 1st Prize at the 2nd Jazz Piano Competition in Warsaw
 2008: Ministry of Culture and National Heritage Scholarship 'Młoda Polska'
 2014: Gwarancja Kultury in the 'Jazz, Rock, and Other' category
 2014: Fryderyk Awards in categories: Jazz Album of the Year (Ravel), Jazz Artist of the Year, Jazz Debut of the Year

Discography

Solo albums 

 2020: Lonely Shadows (ECM)

Trio with Lisa Gerrard/Zbigniew Preisner

 2019: Zbigniew Preisner: Melodies of My Youth (Preisner Productions, Universal Music Polska, Chester Music Ltd.)
 With Dominik Wania Trio
 2013: Ravel (For Tune)

Collaborations 

With George Garzone, Jacek Kochan Andrzej Święs

 2011: Filing The Profile (Intuition)
 With JWP.org
 2004: Organizacja Live at Radio Katowice

 With Vitaliy Ivanov Quartet
 2006: Returning Live in Kiev DVD

 With Bronisław Suchanek & Dominik Wania duo
 2008: Sketch in Blue (Self Release)

 With Geni Skendo & Dominik Wania duo
 2008: Portraits (Shakuhachi & Piano Duets)

 With Jacek Kochan and Michał Barański feat. Gary Thomas
 2008: Man of No Words (GOWI)

 With Tomek Grochot Quintet feat. Eddie Henderson
 2010: My Stories (Self Release)

 With Jacek Kochan Trio feat. George Garzone
 2011: Filling the Profile (Intuition)

 With Maciej Obara Quartet
 2011: Equilibrium (Ars Cameralis Silesiae Superiors), with Maciej Garbowski, Krzysztof Gradziuk
 2017: Unloved (ECM Records), with Ole Morten Vågan, Gard Nilssen
 2019: Three Crowns (ECM Records), with Ole Morten Vågan, Gard Nilssen

 With Piotr Baron Quintet
 2012: Jazz na Hrade Live at Prague Castle (Multisonic)

 With Wojtek Fedkowicz Noise Trio
 2013: Post-Digital Dreamers (Audio Cave)

 With Power of the Horns 
 2013: Alaman Live (For Tune)

 With Maciej Obara International (Ole Morten Vågan, Gard Nilssen)
 2013: Live at Manggha (For Tune)
 2013: Komeda Live (For Tune)
 2015: Live in Mińsk Mazowiecki (For Tune)

 With Nak Trio
 2015: The Other Side of If (Double Moon)
 2017: Ambush (ForTune), Nak Trio & Arcos

 With N S I Quartet (Bartek Prucnal, Cyprian Baszyński, Dawid Fortuna, Maciej Adamczak)
 2017: The Look of Cobra'' (Audio Cave)

References

External links 
 
 
 

Polish jazz pianists
Polish jazz composers
Male jazz composers
ECM Records artists
1981 births
Living people
People from Sanok
Male pianists
21st-century pianists
21st-century male musicians